Mau Ping New Village is a village in Sai Kung District, Hong Kong.

Nearby villages include Pak Kong, Pak Kong Au and Wong Chuk Shan New Village.

Administration
Mau Ping New Village is a recognized village under the New Territories Small House Policy.

See also
 Mau Ping

References

External links

 Delineation of area of existing village Mau Ping New Village (Sai Kung) for election of resident representative (2019 to 2022)

Villages in Sai Kung District, Hong Kong